is a Japanese professional footballer who plays as a midfielder for Women's Super League club Manchester City and the Japan national team. A versatile attacking midfielder, she is also capable of operating as a deep-lying playmaker.

Born in Sendai, Miyagi Prefecture and grew up in Toda, Saitama, Hasegawa played youth football with Tokyo Verdy Beleza before began her career with the senior team in 2013. In 2021, Hasegawa joined AC Milan before moving to West Ham United at the end of 2020-21 Serie A season. She joined Manchester City in the summer of 2022 after spending one season with West Ham United.

A full international since 2017, Hasegawa has represented Japan in the 2019 FIFA World Cup and the 2020 Olympic Games. As of February 2023, she had scored 13 goals in 64 appearances for Japan.

Early life 
Hasegawa was born in Sendai, Miyagi Prefecture on January 29, 1997. She subsequently moved to Todo, Saitama with her family during her childhood. She attended high school at Meguro Nihon University Junior High and High School. She graduated from Nihon University in 2019.

Hasegawa began playing football in kindergarten at the age of six under the influence of her older brothers, and initially played amongst boys before joining a girl's football club around the age of nine. In 2009, aged 11, she was accepted into Menina, the nation's top youth academy of the club she would later play for, Tokyo Verdy Beleza. Over a four-year period from 2011–2014, she was a central figure behind Menina's successive titles at the JFA U-18 All Japan Youth Women's Football Tournaments. While at the academy, she befriended and rose through the ranks with fellow players such as Risa Shimizu and Yuka Momiki, all of whom would go on play for the Japan national team together.

Club career

Tokyo Verdy Beleza 

Having progressed through the youth set-up of Tokyo Verdy Beleza, Hasegawa was promoted to the senior team in 2013. She made her Nadeshiko League debut on 23 March 2013, as a sixteen-year-old, against FC Kibi IU Charme. Despite her young age and relative inexperience in the first team, she quickly established herself as a regular starter in midfield, amongst other more accomplished senior teammates in the Japan national team at the time.

The 2015 season proved to be a breakout year for her in senior football. She scored her first league goal in the Nadeshiko League against Iga FC Kunoichi on 23 September 2015, and played a key part in leading the team to win the championship that year, ending a five-year drought for the domestic title. Hasegawa's time with the club coincide with one of the most successful period for the club. During her eight seasons with Beleza, she won multiple trophies with Beleza; including five successive league titles, five Empress's Cup, three League Cup, and the inaugural AFC Women's Club Championship. She won the domestic triple crown twice with Beleza, having done so consecutively in the 2018 and 2019 season.

Hasegawa was first selected to the Nadeshiko League Best XI in the 2017 season. She would repeated that feat again in 2018, 2019, and 2020, until she left Japan to play overseas in 2021.

At the age of 21, she reached the milestone of 100 league appearances for Beleza on 3 May 2018, in a scoreless draw against Nojima Stella Kanagawa. In total, she made 217 appearances and scored 40 goals for the club .

AC Milan 
On 29 January 2021,  it was announced that Hasegawa would join Serie A Femminile club AC Milan. She netted a brace in her competitive debut for Milan in a 6–1 victory over Pink Bari on 27 February 2021, including one direct free-kick  She was also awarded Player of the Match in that game. In half a season in Italy, Hasegawa helped AC Milan finished runner-up in the league to qualify for the UEFA Women's Champions League 1st round and reached the 2020-21 Coppa Italia final. In total, she featured in nine games and scored three goals for the club.

West Ham United 
In August 2021, Hasegawa signed a two-year contract with English side West Ham United. She scored her first goal for the club's first ever victory over Manchester City in the Women's Super League, assisting the first and scoring the second in their 2–0 win on 3 October 2021. She scored again for West Ham in a 2–1 victory over Reading on 24 April 2022. Both of these goals from Hasegawa won the WSL Goal of the Month awards, with the latter being nominated for the league's Goal of the Season as well. In her first season with the Hammers, Hasegawa helped West Ham achieved sixth-place, their best ever finish in the league thus far, and reached the Women's FA Cup semi-finals.

Manchester City 
On 8 September 2022, Hasegawa signed a three-year deal with fellow WSL side Manchester City. While at Manchester City, she begun playing as a deep-lying playmaker rather than her usual attacking role, filling the gap left behind by Keira Walsh following her departure to FC Barcelona. She scored her first goal for the club in their 4-0 win against Leicester City on 16 October 2022.

International career

Youth 
Hasegawa has been featured throughout all youth levels of the Japan national team set-up, since she was first called up to the U-17 national team in 2011 at the age of 14.

She began her international career as a 15-year-old at the 2012 FIFA U-17 Women's World Cup in Azerbaijan, where she started in two matches against Brazil in the group stage and Ghana in the quarter-final. Japan were knocked out in the 1–0 quarter-final defeat, and Hasegawa ended her first international tournament with 2 goals, from a brace against New Zealand.

The following year, her development was accelerated yet again as she was called up to the U-20 national team to participate in the 2013 AFC U-19 Women's Championship despite still being 16.

As the U-20 squad had failed to qualify for the 2014 FIFA U-20 Women's World Cup that year, Hasegawa returned to her original age group to play in the 2014 FIFA U-17 Women's World Cup in Costa Rica. She started all six matches in Japan's remarkable run that saw them emerge as the champions. A cornerstone of Japan's attack, she scored three goals against Paraguay, New Zealand and Mexico, as she went on to receive the individual honour of the adidas Silver Ball – the second best player of the tournament – behind fellow teammate Hina Sugita who won the Golden Ball.

Senior 

On 1 March 2017, Hasegawa won her first senior cap for the Japan women's national team when she made her debut as a half-time substitute against Spain at the 2017 Algarve Cup. In the following match, she scored her first international goals at senior level, netting twice in Japan's 2–0 win over Iceland.

She was also part of Japan's squad as they defended their Asian Cup title, during the 2018 AFC Women's Asian Cup in Jordan. She provided the assist for Kumi Yokoyama's crucial winning goal that saw Japan lift the trophy, beating regional rivals Australia by a 1–0 scoreline for the second consecutive time. In the same year, she won a gold medal at the 2018 Asian Games, where Japan emerged champions of yet another closely contested final, to win 1–0 over China.

Hasegawa participated in her first World Cup competition at the 2019 FIFA Women's World Cup in France. She was part of a new generation of Nadeshiko stars, as the Japan senior team was in a period of transition, moving on from many of the players who featured in the squad that reached the previous World Cup final, and had lifted the historic title in 2011. Despite Japan's exit to the Netherlands in the Round of 16, Hasegawa's equaliser in that match was nominated for Goal of the Tournament.

In July 2021, Hasegawa took part in the 2020 Summer Olympics held in her home country of Japan. She started in all four of Japan's matches and provided two assists as Japan was eliminated from the competition in the quarter-final, where they lost 3–1 to eventual silver medalists Sweden.

As of February 2023, she has played 64 games and scored 13 goals for Japan.

Style of play 
Primarily an attacking midfielder, Hasegawa most often operates as a wide midfielder on the left in a 4-3-3 formation while playing with Nippon TV Tokyo Verdy Beleza, although her versatility also allows her to occupy many positions in midfield. Hasegawa is described as a player who possesses exceptional ability on the ball, whose electric feet, quick acceleration and low centre of gravity make her an adept dribbler and press resistant. She also possesses a wide variety of passes in her arsenal when combined with her a great passing range and ball carrying capability, made her ranks among the best players in her positions in terms of ball progression. She also possesses a keen sense of tactical awareness and sense of positioning which makes her great penetration threat with or without the ball. Hasegawa is also an effective player on the defensive end where her intense counter pressing in the final third regularly helps her side to quickly regain possession through intercepting opposition play.

Since joining Manchester City, Hasegawa has primarily operate in the holding midfielder position with greater defensive duty compared to her previous roles.

Career statistics

Club

International 

Scores and results list Japan's goal tally first, score column indicates score after each Hasegawa goal.

Honours 
Tokyo Verdy Beleza

 Nadeshiko League: 2015, 2016, 2017, 2018, 2019
 Nadeshiko League Cup: 2016, 2018, 2019
 Empress's Cup: 2014, 2017, 2018, 2019, 2020
 AFC Women's Club Championship: 2019
AC Milan

 Coppa Italia runner-up: 2020-21

Japan U17

 FIFA U-17 Women's World Cup: 2014
Japan
 AFC Women's Asian Cup: 2018
 Asian Games: 2018
 EAFF Women's Football Championship: 2019
Individual
 Nadeshiko League Best Eleven: 2017, 2018, 2019, 2020
 FIFA U-17 Women's World Cup Silver Ball: 2014
 FA Women's Super League Goal of the Month: April 2022

References

External links

Japan Football Association

1997 births
Living people
Nihon University alumni
Association football people from Saitama Prefecture
Japanese women's footballers
Japan women's international footballers
Nadeshiko League players
Nippon TV Tokyo Verdy Beleza players
Women's association football midfielders
A.C. Milan Women players
Serie A (women's football) players
Expatriate women's footballers in Italy
Japanese expatriate sportspeople in Italy
West Ham United F.C. Women players
Manchester City W.F.C. players
Women's Super League players
Footballers at the 2018 Asian Games
Asian Games gold medalists for Japan
Asian Games medalists in football
Medalists at the 2018 Asian Games
2019 FIFA Women's World Cup players
Footballers at the 2020 Summer Olympics
Olympic footballers of Japan
Japanese expatriate sportspeople in England